Eupomphini is a tribe of blister beetles in the family Meloidae. There are about 7 genera and more than 20 described species in Eupomphini.

Genera
These seven genera belong to the tribe Eupomphini:
 Cordylospasta Horn, 1875
 Cysteodemus LeConte, 1851 (desert spider beetles)
 Eupompha LeConte, 1858
 Megetra LeConte, 1859
 Phodaga LeConte, 1858
 Pleuropasta Wellman, 1909
 Tegrodera LeConte, 1851 (iron cross blister beetles)

References

Further reading

External links

 

Meloidae
Articles created by Qbugbot